Ashdot Ya'akov (lit. Ya'akov Rapids) is a kibbutz in northern Israel. Originally founded in 1924 by a kvutza of Hashomer members from Latvia on the land which is today Gesher, it moved to its current location between 1933 and 1935. It was named after the rapids of the nearby Yarmouk River and James "Ya'akov" Armand de Rothschild.

History

Between 1933 and 1935 the kibbutz moved northeast of its original location, onto land which had been bought by the Palestine Jewish Colonization Association. 

The children of Ashod Yaacov were evacuated during the 1948 Arab-Israeli war, when the kibbutz suffered intensive shelling from Syrian, Iraqi and Transjordanian forces.

In 1953, as a result of the split in the HaKibbutz HaMeuhad  movement, the kibbutz was split in two:
Members of Ihud HaKvutzot VeHaKibbutzim established Ashdot Ya'akov Ihud
Members of HaKibbutz HaMeuhad established Ashdot Ya'akov Meuhad

South of Ashdot Ya'akov, at the confluence of the Jordan and Yarmouk rivers near the island of Naharayim, there is a memorial for the 7 twelve-year-old Israeli girls murdered by a Jordanian border guard in March 1997.

References
 

Former kibbutzim
Populated places established in 1924
Jewish villages in Mandatory Palestine
Emek HaYarden Regional Council
Populated places in Northern District (Israel)
1924 establishments in Mandatory Palestine
1953 disestablishments in Israel
Populated places disestablished in 1953